Keïta! l'Héritage du griot (English title: Keita! Voice of the Griot) is a 1995 Burkinabé film directed by Dani Kouyaté and starring Sotigui Kouyaté. It is an adaptation of the first third of the 13th-century Epic of Sundiata, interspersed with scenes of a griot telling the story to a young child.

Plot

Keïta follows Mabo Keïta (Dicko), a thirteen-year-old boy who lives in a middle-class family in Ouagadougou and attends a good school. One day he encounters Djeliba Kouyate (Kouyaté), an elderly griot, who wants to tell the young Keïta the origin of his name, being related to Sundjata Keita (Boro).

Kouyate begins his story with the Mandeng creation myth: As all living beings come together in the newly formed Earth, one man proclaims to the masses that he wants to be their king. They respond, "We do not hate you." The old griot goes on to tell how Keita's family are descended from buffalo, the blackbirds are always watching him, and how people have roots that are deep in the earth.

The film shows realistic-looking flashbacks to ancient times and ends with Sundjata Keita being exiled from the Kingdom of Mande, to which he lays claim.

Cast
Seydou Boro as Sundjata Keita 
Hamed Dicko as Mabo Keïta 
Abdoulaye Komboudri as Drissa Fafana 
Sotigui Kouyaté as Djeliba Kouyate; Sotigui Kouyaté is the father of the director of the film, Dani Kouyaté
Claire Sanon as Sitan
Blandine Yaméogo as Sogolon

Production
Dani Kouyaté directed a number of short films before the release of Keïta, his first full-length feature. The film's working title was Keita: From Mouth to Ear. It was shot in the towns of Ouagadougou, Sindou, and Ouahabou.
The assistant director was Alidou Badini.

Reception
Keïta! received the Best First Film Prize from the Panafrican Film and Television Festival of Ouagadougou (Fespaco) and was awarded the Junior Prize at the Cannes Film Festival. The New York Times praised the film, claiming it "succeeds admirably in keeping... history alive." In a 1995 interview, Kouyate reflected on the experience and commenting on traditional society, saying:

Notes

References

External links 
 

1995 films
1995 drama films
African fantasy films
Burkinabé drama films
1990s French-language films